Periodic graph may refer to:

Periodic graph (crystallography) or crystal net, a Euclidean graph representing the atomic or molecular structure of a crystal
Periodic graph (geometry), a Euclidean graph preserved under a lattice of translations
Periodic graph (graph theory), a graph that is periodic with respect to a graph theoretic operator